Ship's diver was a diving qualification in the Royal Navy.

Ship's divers
Officers and Ratings from all branches could apply. Members of the RN who volunteered as Ship's Divers underwent a one-day aptitude test, concentrating on swimming ability and suitability for diving.

Those selected went on a four-week course, which consisted of basic compressed air (open-circuit) diving. There was also extensive instruction (and practice) on searching ships bottoms for explosives, as well as instruction in working on ship's hulls, decompression chambers and maintenance of diving equipment.

On completion, the diver  returned to his ship or shore establishment and to maintain their qualification (and get their diving pay) were required to dive for at least 120 minutes during each four-month period.

Aircrew divers
Later in their careers some Ship's Divers undertake further training in order to qualify as Search and Rescue Helicopter crew. As well as general SAR duties they are also trained to jump from Helicopters in order to rescue aircrew of fixed wing aircraft should it ditch on take off from an Aircraft Carrier.

Ships' Divers were to disappear entirely from the Royal Navy in 2006, to be replaced by roving Clearance Diver Teams that will accompany deployment groups. All Ships Diver training stopped as of 1st Oct 2005.

External links
Royal Navy Northern Diving Group
Royal Navy Southern Diving Group
Royal Navy Fleet Diving Units
http://www.shipsdiver.org.uk
http://www.aircrewman.org.uk

Armed forces diving
Ships divers
Underwater diving in the United Kingdom